Hannah Roberts may refer to:
 Hannah Roberts (Miss Mississippi)
 Hannah Roberts (BMX cyclist)
 Hannah Roberts (cellist)